"That's Good, That's Bad" is a 1951 hit song sung by Jo Stafford and Frankie Laine. It was written by Ervin Drake and Jimmy Shirl.

References

1951 songs
Frankie Laine songs